Stipe may refer to:

Biological terminology
 Stipe (botany)
 Stipe (mycology)

Human names
 Stipe (given name)
 Stipe (surname)